This is a list of damselflies arranged into families.

Family Amphipterygidae

 Amphipteryx agrioides
 Amphipteryx longicaudatus

Family Calopterygidae

See List of damselflies of the world (Calopterygidae)

Family Chlorocyphidae

See List of damselflies of the world (Chlorocyphidae)

Family Coenagrionidae

See List of damselflies of the world (Coenagrionidae)

Family Coryphagrionidae

 Coryphagrion grandis

Family Devadattidae

 Devadatta argyoides
 Devadatta ducatrix
 Devadatta multinervosa
 Devadatta podolestoides

Family Dicteriadidae

 Dicterias atrosanguinea
 Heliocharis amazona

Family Euphaeidae

See List of damselflies of the world (Euphaeidae)

Family Hemiphlebiidae

 Hemiphlebia mirabilis

Family Isostictidae

See List of damselflies of the world (Isostictidae)

Family Lestidae

See List of damselflies of the world (Lestidae)

Family Lestoideidae

Diphlebia coerulescens
Diphlebia euphoeoides
Diphlebia hybridoides
Diphlebia lestoides
Diphlebia nymphoides
 Lestoidea barbarae
 Lestoidea brevicauda
 Lestoidea conjuncta
 Lestoidea lewisiana

Family Megapodagrionidae

See List of damselflies of the world (Megapodagrionidae)

Family Pentaphlebiidae
 Pentaphlebia gamblesi
 Pentaphlebia stahli

Family Perilestidae

Nubiolestes diotima
Perilestes attenuatus
Perilestes bispinus
Perilestes fragilis
Perilestes gracillimus
Perilestes kahli
Perilestes minor
Perilestes solutus
Perissolestes aculeatus
Perissolestes castor
Perissolestes cornutus
Perissolestes flinti
Perissolestes guianensis
Perissolestes klugi
Perissolestes magdalenae
Perissolestes paprzyckii
Perissolestes pollux
Perissolestes remotus
Perissolestes remus
Perissolestes romulus

Family Philogangidae

Philoganga loringae
Philoganga montana
Philoganga robusta
Philoganga vetusta

Family Platycnemididae

See List of damselflies of the world (Platycnemididae)

Family Platystictidae

See List of damselflies of the world (Platystictidae)

Family Polythoridae

See List of damselflies of the world (Polythoridae)

Family Protoneuridae

See List of damselflies of the world (Protoneuridae)

Family Pseudostigmatidae

Anomisma abnorme
Mecistogaster amalia
Mecistogaster amazonica
Mecistogaster asticta
Mecistogaster buckleyi
Mecistogaster jocaste
Mecistogaster linearis
Mecistogaster lucretia
Mecistogaster martinezi
Mecistogaster modesta
Mecistogaster ornata
Mecistogaster pronoti
Megaloprepus caerulatus
Microstigma anomalum
Microstigma maculatum
Microstigma rotundatum
Pseudostigma aberrans
Pseudostigma accedens

Family Rimanellidae

 Rimanella arcana

Family Synlestidae

See List of damselflies of the world (Synlestidae)

Family Thaumatoneuridae

 Thaumatoneura inopinata